Anomoeodus is an extinct genus of prehistoric ray-finned fish belonging to the family Pycnodontidae. This genus lived during the Late Cretaceous period, ranging from the Albian to Maastrichtian ages, and had a wide geographic distribution, with fossils found in France, Belgium, the Netherlands, Spain, Egypt, Uzbekistan, and the United States. The first fossils of Anomoeodus were described by Louis Agassiz in 1835.

Description 
Anomoeodus was one of the largest genera of Pycnodontiformes, with some species reaching up to 1 meter (3.3ft) in length. It had a deep and laterally compressed body, with a relatively small head and a large dorsal fin. Like many members of its family, Anomoeodus had strong jaws and teeth adapted for crushing hard prey, making it mainly durophagous. Its diet is believed to have consisted primarily of crustaceans and mollusks.

Anomoeodus had a distinctive morphology that allowed it to be easily identified. The genus had an elongated dorsal fin, which was positioned far back on its body, and a long anal fin. Its pectoral fins were relatively small, while the pelvic fins were positioned far back on the body. The scales of Anomoeodus were large and thick, with a distinctive concentric growth pattern.

Species 
There are currently 15 recognized species of Anomoeodus, with several of these being further divided into subspecies. Some of the most notable species include:

Anomoeodus becklesii

Anomoeodus clementis

Anomoeodus cuvieri

Anomoeodus disjunctus

Anomoeodus eutypus

Anomoeodus hermanvanparijsi 

Anomoeodus jurensis

Anomoeodus latipinnis

Anomoeodus pharaoensis

Anomoeodus pricei

Anomoeodus robustus

Anomoeodus sphaerodus

Anomoeodus stantoni

Anomoeodus subclavatus

Anomoeodus ultimus

Fossil Record 
Fossils of Anomoeodus have been found in marine deposits from the Late Cretaceous period. In North America, they have been found in the Niobrara Formation in Wyoming and South Dakota, and the Eagle Ford Formation in Texas. In Europe, Anomoeodus fossils have been found in the Upper Cretaceous strata of Spain, Belgium, the Netherlands, France, and Uzbekistan. In Africa, fossils have been found in Egypt.

Paleoecology 
Anomoeodus lived in a variety of marine environments, from shallow coastal waters to deeper offshore environments. It is believed to have been a relatively common component of Cretaceous marine faunas. Some species, such as Anomoeodus ultimus, are believed to have been able to tolerate brackish water environments, while others, such as Anomoeodus jurensis, are only known from offshore marine deposits.

In addition to its role as a predator of crustaceans and mollusks, Anomoeodus likely served as a prey item for larger marine predators, such as mosasaurs and sharks. The thick scales and heavily armored head of Anomoeodus likely provided some protection from predation, although it is unknown how effective this defense mechanism was in practice.

See also
 Prehistoric fish
 List of prehistoric bony fish

References 

Pycnodontiformes genera
Albian genus first appearances
Maastrichtian genus extinctions
Late Cretaceous fish
Cretaceous bony fish
Cretaceous fish of Africa
Cretaceous Africa
Fossils of Egypt
Cretaceous fish of Asia
Cretaceous Asia
Fossils of Uzbekistan
Cretaceous fish of Europe
Cretaceous France
Fossils of France
Cretaceous Sweden
Fossils of Sweden
Cretaceous fish of North America
Fossils of the United States
Fossil taxa described in 1887